They're a Weird Mob is a 1966 Australian film based on the 1957 novel of the same name by John O'Grady under the pen name "Nino Culotta", the name of the main character of the book. It was the penultimate collaboration of the British filmmakers Michael Powell and Emeric Pressburger.

Plot
Nino Culotta is an Italian immigrant, newly arrived in Australia. He expected to work for his cousin as a sports writer for an Italian language magazine. However, on arrival in Sydney, Nino discovers that the cousin has abandoned the magazine, leaving a substantial debt to Kay Kelly. Nino declares that he will get a job and pay back the debt.

Working as a labourer Nino becomes mates with his co-workers, despite some difficulties with Australian slang and culture of the 1960s. Nino endeavours to understand the aspirational values and social rituals of everyday urban Australians, and assimilate. A romantic attraction builds between Nino and Kay despite her frosty exterior and her conservative Irish father's dislike of Italians.

A tone of mild racism exists in the film between Anglo-Saxon/Anglo-Irish characters such as Kay Kelly's dad Harry (Chips Rafferty) and Nino. Harry says he doesn't like writers, brickies or dagos. Nino is all three. But this is undermined when Nino, sitting in the Kelly house notices a picture of the pope on the wall. Nino says "If I am a dago, then so is he". Realising the impossibility of referring to the pope by that derogatory term, Harry gives in.

Cast

Walter Chiari as Nino Culotta
Claire Dunne as Kay Kelly
Chips Rafferty as Harry Kelly
Alida Chelli as Giuliana
Ed Devereaux as Joe Kennedy
Slim DeGrey as Pat
John Meillon as Dennis
Charles Little as Jimmy
Anne Haddy as Barmaid
Jack Allen as Fat Man in Bar
Red Moore as Texture Man
Ray Hartley as Newsboy
Tony Bonner as Lifesaver
Alan Lander as Charlie
Keith Peterson as Drunk Man on Ferry
Muriel Steinbeck as Mrs Kelly
Gloria Dawn as Mrs Chapman
Jeanie Drynan as Betty
Gita Rivera as Maria
Judith Arthy as Dixie
Doreen Warburton as Edie
Barry Creyton as Hotel clerk
Graham Kennedy as himself (cameo)
Robert McDarra as Hotel Manager
Judi Farr as Hotel Telephonist (uncredited)
Noel Brophy as Irate Ferry Passenger
Jacki Weaver
Liza Goddard as Girl on Ferry (uncredited)
Ken James as Bellboy at King's Cross Hotel (uncredited)
John Hargreaves as Youth at Train Station (uncredited)

Cast notes
John O'Grady, the author of the novel, makes a cameo appearance as the grey-bearded drinker in the pub in the opening sequence of the film.
Alida Chelli was the girlfriend of Walter Chiari, but almost did not get the part because she was thought to be too glamorous and might have upstaged Claire Dunne.

Production

Development
They're a Weird Mob was optioned in 1959 by Gregory Peck with him to direct but not appear, but he could not come up with a workable screenplay. Michael Powell first read the novel in London in 1960 and wanted to turn it into a film but Peck had the rights. Powell obtained them three years later and brought in his long-time collaborator Emeric Pressburger, who wrote the screenplay under the pseudonym "Richard Imrie."

Finance
The film was one of a series of movies financed together by Rank and the NFFC. £166,925 of the budget came from the NFFC and Rank, the rest from the production company Williamson-Powell International Films.

Casting
Walter Chiari had previously visited Australia during the filming of On the Beach (1959), which starred his then-girlfriend Ava Gardner. Claire Dunne was working as a weather girl when cast in the female lead.

It was one of Muriel Steinbeck's last acting roles.

Shooting
The film started filming in October 1965 and was shot at a number of locations in the area of Sydney:
Bondi Beach
Circular Quay (where the ferry comes ashore)
Clark Island (the beach party)
Hunter Street and Elizabeth Street in the central business district
Martin Place (where Graham Kennedy asks Nino for directions)
Manly Beach
Neutral Bay (final scene shot at 9 Wallaringa Ave, Neutral Bay)
"The House That Nino Built" is located at 128 Greenacre Road in Greenacre, a suburb of Sydney. The actors dug trenches, poured concrete, laid bricks and so on, and it was then finished professionally and sold to raise funds for The Royal Life Saving Society. The stars' footprints were set in concrete slabs in the pathway.
Punchbowl railway station, where Nino is picked up by Joe prior to his first day at work has changed over the years. In a previous configuration it was possible to park a vehicle virtually at the bottom of the northern steps.
Balgowlah Heights The place where Nino & Kay want to build their home is referred to in the "making of " documentary as Grotto Point. Balgowlah Heights is on Dobroyd Head on the north side of the entrance to Middle Harbour.

The film has been credited with the revival of the moribund Australian film industry, which led to the Australian "New Wave" films of the 1970s.

Box office
They're a Weird Mob grossed $2,417,000 at the box office in Australia, . However it performed poorly outside Australia. The NFFC reported its overseas earnings on the film as £207,821.

In 1968 John McCallum wrote that of the $2 million the film had then earned, only $400,000 had been returned to the film-makers.

A behind-the-scenes documentary was shot called The Story of the Making of 'They're a Weird Mob'.

DVD
The film has been released on Region 4 DVD by Roadshow. The DVD includes a TV special, "The Story of Making the Film They're a Weird Mob" as well as a picture gallery, theatrical trailer and optional subtitles.

The film has been released on Region 2 DVD by Opening in the Les films de ma vie series. The DVD has fixed French subtitles for the original English soundtrack.

See also
Cinema of Australia
Italian Australians

References

Notes

External links
 
 
 
 Reviews and articles at the Powell & Pressburger Pages
 They're a Weird Mob at the National Film and Sound Archive
 They're a Weird Mob at Australian Screen Online
They're a Weird Mob at Oz Movies
Peter Krausz, "They're a Weird Mob", ACMI

1966 films
1960s Australian films
1960s English-language films
Australian comedy films
Films set in Sydney
Films based on Australian novels
Films directed by Michael Powell
Films by Powell and Pressburger
Films shot in Sydney
Films scored by Mikis Theodorakis
Films about immigration
1966 comedy films